The Republic of Poland Ambassador to Estonia is the official representative of the President and the Government of Poland to the President and the Government of Estonia.

The ambassador and his staff work in the Polish embassy in Tallinn. The current Poland ambassador to Estonia is Grzegorz Kozłowski, incumbent since February 14, 2018.

History 
Poland established diplomatic relations with Estonia on May 4, 1921, when representative of the Republic of Estonia delivered letter of credence to the Polish Ministry of Foreign Affairs.

On September 30, 1939, diplomatic relations between Poland and Estonia were dissolved because of the Soviet-German Molotov–Ribbentrop Pact, which expropriated among others Poland and Estonia. Between 1939 and 1991 there was no official relations between Polish People's Republic led by communists and Estonian SSR, which was a part of the Soviet Union. However, there were bilateral relations between Polish government-in-exile and Estonian government-in-exile.

In 1989 Poland extricated from the Iron Curtain, in turn in 1991 Estonia gained independence. On September 2, 1991, diplomatic relations between countries were officially restored. In 1993 Poland opened embassy in Tallinn.

List of ambassadors of Poland to Estonia

Second Polish Republic 

 1920-1921: Leon Wasilewski (envoy)
 1921-1922: Michał Sokolnicki (envoy)
 1922-1924: Wacław Tadeusz Dobrzyński (envoy)
 1924-1928: Franciszek Charwat (envoy)
 1928-1929: Józef Wołodkowicz (chargé d’affaires)
 1929-1929: Kazimierz Papée (chargé d’affaires)
 1929-1933: Konrad Libicki (envoy)
 1933-1934: Jan Starzewski (chargé d’affaires)
 1934-1939: Wacław Przesmycki (envoy)

Third Polish Republic 

 1991-1992: Jarosław Lindenberg (chargé d’affaires)
 1992-1993: Jan Kostrzak (chargé d’affaires)
 1993-1994: Jarosław Lindenberg
 1994-2001: Jakub Wołąsiewicz
 2001-2005: Wojciech z Wróblewski
 2005-2010: Tomasz Chłoń
 2010-2014: Grzegorz Marek Poznański
 2014-2018: Robert Filipczak
 since 2018: Grzegorz Kozłowski

See also 

 List of ambassadors of Poland to Finland

References 

 
Estonia
Poland